A zero-tolerance policy in schools is a strict enforcement of regulations and bans against behaviors or the possession of items deemed undesirable. Public criticism against the enforcement of such policies has arisen due to potential negative consequences when acts deemed intolerable are done in ignorance, by accident, or under extenuating circumstances, in addition to its connection to educational inequality in the United States. In schools, common zero-tolerance policies concern possession or use of illicit drugs or weapons.  Students, and sometimes staff, parents, and other visitors, who possess a banned item for any reason are always (if the policy is followed) to be punished.

In the United States and Canada, zero-tolerance policies have been adopted in various schools and other educational platforms.  Zero-tolerance policies in the United States became widespread in 1994, after federal legislation required states to expel student’s for one year if they bring a firearm to school, or the school could lose all federal funding.

These policies are promoted for preventing drug abuse and violence in schools. Critics say zero-tolerance policies in schools have resulted in punishments that have been criticized as egregiously unfair against students and teachers, especially in schools with poorly written policies. Consequently, critics describe these  policies as "zero-logic policies" because they treat juveniles the way that adults would be treated — or more harshly, given that children are seldom granted full permission to speak up in their own defense to adults with authority over them. Many people have been critical of zero-tolerance policies, claiming that they are draconian, provide little if any benefit to anyone, contribute to overcrowding of the criminal justice system, and/or disproportionately target people of color, particularly people of African-American and Hispanic descent.

Research
There is no concrete evidence that zero-tolerance reduces violence or drug abuse by students. Furthermore, school suspension and expulsion result in a number of negative outcomes for both schools and students. The American Bar Association finds that the evidence indicates that minority children are the most likely to suffer the negative consequences of zero-tolerance policies. Analysis of the suspension rate of students shows that black females and other racial minorities are suspended at a greater rate. The American Psychological Association concluded that the available evidence does not support the use of zero-tolerance policies as defined and implemented, that there is a clear need to modify such policies, and that the policies create a number of unintended negative consequences, including making schools "less safe".

In 2014, a study of school discipline figures was conducted. It was found that suspensions and expulsions as a result of zero-tolerance policies have not reduced school disruptions. The study's author stated that "zero-tolerance approaches to school discipline are not the best way to create a safe climate for learning". Zero-tolerance policies are sometimes viewed as a quick fix solution for student problems. While this seems like a simple action-reaction type of situation, it often leaves out the mitigating circumstances that are often the important details in student incidents. Even civilian judges consider mitigating circumstances before passing judgment or sentencing. If zero-tolerance policies were applied in adult courtroom scenarios, they would be fundamentally unjust and unconstitutional due to neglecting the laws involving due process, along with cruel and unusual punishments.

History
The label of zero-tolerance began with the Gun-Free Schools Act of 1994, when Congress authorized public-school funding subject to the adoption of zero-tolerance policies. Similar policies of intolerance coupled with expulsions for less serious behaviors than bringing a weapon to school had long been a part of private, and particularly religious schools. The use of zero-tolerance policies in public schools increased dramatically after the Columbine High School massacre, with principals declaring that safety concerns made them want zero-tolerance for weapons. These have led to a large number of disproportionate responses to minor, or technical transgressions, many of that have attracted the attention of the international media. These cases include students being suspended or expelled for such offenses as possession of ibuprofen or Midol (both legal, non-prescription drugs commonly used to treat headaches and menstrual cramps respectively) with permission of the students' parents, keeping pocketknives (small utility knife) in cars, and carrying sharp tools outside of a woodshop classroom (where they are often required materials). In Seal v. Morgan, a student was expelled for having a knife in his car on school property, despite his protestations that he was unaware of the knife's presence. In some jurisdictions, zero-tolerance policies have come into conflict with freedom of religion rules already in place allowing students to carry, for example, kirpans.

In the "kids for cash" scandal, judge Mark Ciavarella, who promoted a platform of zero-tolerance, received kickbacks for constructing a private prison that housed juvenile offenders, and then proceeded to fill the prison by sentencing children to extended stays in juvenile detention for offenses as minimal as mocking a principal on Myspace, scuffles in hallways, trespassing in a vacant building, and shoplifting DVDs from Wal-Mart. Critics of zero-tolerance policies argue that harsh punishments for minor offenses are normalized. The documentary Kids for Cash interviews experts on adolescent behavior, who argue that the zero-tolerance model has become a dominant approach to policing juvenile offenses after the Columbine shooting.

In New York City, Carmen Fariña, head of the New York City Department of Education, restricted school suspension by principals in 2015. The Los Angeles Unified school board, responsible for educating 700,000 students, voted in 2013 to ban suspensions for "willful defiance", which had mostly been used against students from racial minorities. A year later, the same school district decided to decriminalize school discipline so that minor offenses would be referred to school staff rather than prosecuted—the previous approach had resulted in black students being six times more likely to be arrested or given a ticket than white students. The district saw suspensions drop by 53%, and graduation rates rise by 12%.

Media attention
Media attention has proven embarrassing to school officials, resulting in changes to state laws as well as to local school policies. One school board member gave this reason for changes his district made to their rigid policy: "We are doing this because we got egg on our face."

 A student at Sandusky High School in Sandusky, Ohio, was suspended for 90 days and failed, after school authorities searched him for drugs in September 1999, and found a broken pocketknife. He had used the knife to clean his golfing cleats.
 The Christina School District in Newark, Delaware, has experienced multiple highly publicized cases of zero-tolerance:
 After bringing a Cub Scouts dinner knife to school to eat his lunch, a six-year-old boy was ordered to attend an alternative school for students with behavioral problems for nine weeks. After a media uproar, the school board voted unanimously to reduce punishments for kindergartners and first-graders who take weapons to school to a 3-5 day mandatory suspension, retaining the original definition of "weapons".
Kasia Haughton, running for fifth-grade mayor at the Leasure Elementary School in Newark, Delaware was suspended and faced possible expulsion after coming to school with a knife to cut the cake. School officials were called in to investigate the incident, and referred to the knife as a "deadly weapon."
 Other cases include a straight-A student who was ordered to attend "reform school" after a classmate dropped a pocket knife in his lap, and in 2007, when a girl was expelled for using a utility knife to cut paper for a project.
 Earlier in 2009, an Eagle Scout in New York was suspended for 20 days for having an emergency supply kit in his car that included a pocket knife.
 A kindergartner in Grand Rapids, Michigan, was suspended in March 2010 for making a finger gun.
 Another kindergartner, in Pennsylvania, was suspended for 10 days in January 2013 for referring to "shooting" a friend with a Hello Kitty bubble making gun.  The suspension was reduced to two days after the parent met with school officials.
 A second-grader in Baltimore, Maryland, was suspended in March 2013 for biting a Pop-Tart into the shape of a mountain, which school officials mistook for a gun.
 6-year-old Hunter Yelton in Colorado was suspended in 2013 for alleged repeated sexual harassment of a 6-year-old schoolmate, a charge the boy's family disputed. Following widespread negative media coverage and public disapproval, the school agreed to downgrade the suspension caused by "misconduct".
 A freshman at MacArthur High School in Irving, Texas, was suspended for a week in September 2015 after he put a digital alarm clock in a pencil box, and took it to his school to show a teacher. When the device beeped while in one class, the student was suspended and detained on suspicion of creating a hoax bomb.
 In the Escondido school knives case, Brian Capalletti and another student in San Diego were suspended from school for between 2 and 3 weeks and faced criminal charges and possible expulsion after knives were found in their vehicles parked outside their Escondido high school.

Promotion
Proponents of punishment- and exclusion-based philosophy of school discipline policies claim that such policies are required to create an appropriate environment for learning. This rests on the assumption that strong
enforcement can act as a psychological deterrent to other potentially disruptive students.

The policy assumption is that inflexibility is a deterrent because, no matter how or why the rule was broken, the fact that the rule was broken is the basis for the imposition of the penalty. This is intended as a behavior modification strategy:  since those at risk know that it may operate unfairly, they may be induced to take even unreasonable steps to avoid breaking the rule. This is a standard policy in rule- and law-based systems around the world on "offenses" as minor as traffic violations to major health and safety legislation for the protection of employees and the environment.

Disciplinarian parents view zero-tolerance policies as a tool to fight corruption. Under this argument, if subjective judgment is not allowed, most attempts by the authorised person to encourage bribes or other favors in exchange for leniency are clearly visible.

Criticism
Critics of zero-tolerance policies in schools say they are part of a school-to-prison pipeline that over-polices children with behavioral problems, treating their problems as criminal justice issues rather than educational and behavioral problems. Students that may previously have been given short school suspensions before the implementation of policies are now sent to juvenile courts.

Critics of zero-tolerance policies frequently refer to cases where minor offenses have resulted in severe punishments. Typical examples include the honor-roll student being expelled from school under a "no weapons" policy while in possession of nail clippers, or for possessing "drugs" like cough drops and dental mouthwash or "weapons" like rubber bands.

A related criticism is that zero-tolerance policies make schools feel like a jail or a prison.
Furthermore zero-tolerance policies have been struck down by U.S. courts and by departments of education.

Another criticism is that the zero-tolerance policies have actually caused schools to turn a blind eye to bullying, resulting in them refusing to solve individual cases in an attempt to make their image look better. The zero-tolerance policy also punishes both the attacker and the defender in a fight, even when the attacker was the one who started the fight unprovoked. In 2017, the Georgia Supreme Court ruled that public schools within Georgia could not have a zero-tolerance policy for violence that does not allow for self-defense.

A particularly dismaying hypothesis about zero-tolerance policies is that they may actually discourage some people from reporting criminal and illegal behavior, for fear of losing relationships, and for many other reasons. That is, ironically, zero-tolerance policies may be ineffective in the very purpose for which they were originally designed.

As schools develop responses to online bullying, schools that have overly harsh approaches to zero-tolerance policies may increasingly police speech of students in their own time that would normally be protected by free speech laws.

The American Bar Association opposes "zero-tolerance policies that mandate either expulsion or referral of students to juvenile or criminal court, without regard to the circumstances or nature of the offense or the students history."

Critics of zero-tolerance policies also argue that the large numbers of students who are suspended and expelled from school experience negative effects, which can prohibit them from finishing high school. Students who experience suspension, expulsion and arrests pay higher psychological and social costs: such as depression, suicidal thoughts, academic failure, and run the risk of being incarcerated as adults. In a study by Forrest et al., (2000), psychologists identified that a third of youths in juvenile detention centers were diagnosed with depression shortly after being incarcerated. In addition to being diagnosed with depression many youths found themselves having suicidal thoughts (Gnau et al. 1997).

Research found that black, Latino, and white adults with low educational attainment risked a higher propensity of being incarcerated in their lifetime (Pettit & Western 2010). The same study found that the incarceration rate in 2008 was 37% and had risen since the 1980s. That showed that incarceration rates of people with low levels of education were continuing to rise and that students were not completing their high school requirements.

According to kidsdata.org, 21,638 students were suspended and 592 students were expelled from San Diego County schools in 2012. A total of 10.1% of students did not complete their high school diploma.

Despite a decrease in juvenile arrest, suspensions, expulsions, and drop out rates, many still argue that these disciplinary policies have helped contribute to students not completing their high school curriculum. Schools are struggling to keep students within the walls of the educational system rather than the walls of a juvenile detention center.

Reforms to zero-tolerance policies 
The American Psychological Association (APA) assembled a Zero-Tolerance Task Force in 2008 that reviewed data and extensive literature on zero-tolerance policies and their effect on student behavior. After synthesizing the evidence, the APA found that zero-tolerance policies do not support child development nor improve school climate or school safety. The APA made several recommendations to reform zero-tolerance policies for serious infractions.

 One reform introduced by the APA was for school staff to consider teacher expertise and allow for greater flexibility when applying zero-tolerance policies. According to the APA, professional school staff need greater discretion when applying zero-tolerance policies because they are often the best mediators when evaluating infractions.
 Similarly, the APA recommended that all offenses be defined and that school officials be adequately trained to handle each offense. The APA affirmed that adequate teacher training will (1) protect teachers from being wrongfully accused of how they applied their school policy and (2) protect students from unfair repercussions.
 Another reform presented by the APA was for schools to evaluate their disciplinary prevention strategies. The APA maintained that schools, after evaluating their existing interventions and programs, would have strategies that have a positive effect on student behavior and school climate.

Alternatives to zero-tolerance policies 
For less severe infractions, the American Psychological Association (APA) provided alternatives to zero-tolerance policies to ensure that students are not denied their opportunity to learn.

 The APA encouraged schools to implement preventive strategies that foster student support and a sense of community as an alternative to zero-tolerance policies. In particular, the APA asserted that research-supported preventive strategies improve the school climate and sense of community in schools, whereas zero-tolerance policies result in immediate punishment.
 For students who consistently engage in disruptive behavior, the APA recommended that schools design a list of effective alternatives they can use with students. The APA discussed various options that schools can implement to decrease disruptive behavior, including restorative justice, alternative programs, and community service.
 The APA also promoted increasing culturally relevant training available to teachers. According to the APA, this strategy is important for teachers to integrate culturally responsive management and instruction in their classrooms and, therefore, reduce the disproportionate amount of disciplinary referrals to maximize student learning.

Escondido school knives case

The Escondido school knives case was a collection of school suspensions, possible expulsions, and protests surrounding knives that were found in the cars of two students at San Pasqual High School in Escondido, California.

Discovery and arrests 
Brandon Cappeletti, an 18-year-old student at the school, had been on a fishing trip in early January, 2016. He says he had used the knives to cut line and would have used them to prepare fish. After the fishing trip, he left the knives in his truck. Another 16-year-old student had a pocket knife in his glove compartment.

On January 27, police dogs were sniffing vehicles in the school's parking lot. Each student had Advil in the truck. In each case, the dogs alerted on the Advil. Cappeletti was called out of class to unlock the truck. The police found the Advil and the knives. In the case of the 16-year-old, the alert led to the police finding the pocket knife.

Both boys were arrested. Cappeletti was later released to his mother. The 16-year-old's case was referred to the California's juvenile diversion program. Both boys were charged with a misdemeanor for having a knife on school property with a blade longer than two-and-a-half inches (about six centimeters). Both were also immediately suspended from classes.

Impact and protests
Cappeletti had already joined the U.S. Marine Corps. Had he been convicted of the misdemeanor, he might not have been able to remain. His mother Amy Cappelletti said, “He's the most patriotic student. He never gets into trouble. These weren't Crocodile Dundee knives.” At a School Board meeting on February 9, 2016, hundreds of people asked the Board not to expel the two students. Tony Coreley, the high school's football coach said that “There are rules and laws that the district has to follow, but this (situation) is unfortunate.” School District spokeswoman Karyl O’Brien said that the rules were the result of California's zero-tolerance policy.

Resolution
On February 11, 2016, the superintendent of the Escondido Union School District stated that the students would not be expelled and that they were expected to be allowed to return to school the following week. Both boys have since been exonerated from misdemeanor citations and juvenile diversion programs.

See also
Juvenile Law Center
School district drug policies
Gun-Free School Zones Act of 1990
School disturbance laws
Zero-defects mentality, a similar policy used in the military

Notes

References
 American Psychological Association. (2008). Are zero-tolerance policies effective in the schools?: An evidentiary review and recommendations. American Psychologist,63(9), 852-862. doi:10.1037/0003-066x.63.9.852 
 
 Robinson, M. (2002). Justice Blind? Ideals and Realities of American Criminal Justice. Upper Saddle River, NJ: Prentice-Hall.
 Rowe, Mary and Bendersky, Corinne, "Workplace Justice, Zero-Tolerance and Zero Barriers: Getting People to Come Forward in Conflict Management Systems," in Negotiations and Change, From the Workplace to Society, Thomas Kochan and Richard Locke (editors), Cornell University Press, 2002
 Sherman, L., D., Gottfredson, D. MacKenzie, J. Eck, P. Reuter & S. Bushway. (1997). "Preventing Crime: What Works, What Doesn't, What's Promising." 
 Snider, Laureen. (2004) "Zero-Tolerance Reversed: Constituting the Non-Culpable Subject in Walkerton" in What is a Crime? Defining Criminal Conduct in Contemporary Canadian Society. Vancouver: University of British Columbia Press, and Montreal: Laval University Press (French translation), 2004: 155-84.

External links
 "Losing my Tolerance for 'Zero-Tolerance'" article by journalist Randy Cassingham on Zero-Tolerance
 "The Zero-Intelligence Policy" by W. Bruce Cameron

Education issues
Criminology
Juvenile law
School and classroom behaviour
English phrases
Slogans
School punishments